Cowes railway station was a railway station in Cowes on the Isle of Wight, off the south coast of England. It took pride in being the "prettiest station on the Garden Isle".

History
Opened in 1862, the very first on the island, as part of the inaugural "Cowes and Newport" railway, it expanded to three platforms as the railway branched out towards Ryde in the years before the motor bus began to diminish trade. In its time prosperous enough to have a WH Smith bookstall, its  latter years were considerably leaner as more and more people took their holidays abroad. The station has long since been demolished and today the area is a supermarket and municipal car park.

In its later years Cowes station was notable for an unusual operating procedure. The engine would propel its empty carriages backwards up the 1-in-95 gradient towards Mill Hill and then run forward and round the train using a crossover. The carriages were then allowed to run back down into the station by gravity, controlled by handbrake by the guard, and the locomotive was reattached to haul its train back to Newport and Ryde.

Stationmasters

Mr. Phillips until 1869
William Alford ca. 1879 - 1885
J.R. Thomas from 1885
William B.S. Greenwood 1889 - 1891 (formerly station master at Newport)
George William Ranger 1891 - 1894 (formerly station master at Yarmouth, afterwards station master at Newport)
Thomas Henry Tutton ca. 1896 - 1913
Samuel Urry 1913 - 1914 (formerly station master at Freshwater)
Henry L. Hill 1914 -  ca. 1938
Francis E. West 1944 - 1952 (formerly station master at Rowlands Castle, afterwards station master at Alton)

See also 
 List of closed railway stations in Britain

References

External links
 Picture of closed station in 1970

Disused railway stations on the Isle of Wight
Former Isle of Wight Central Railway stations
Railway stations in Great Britain opened in 1862
Railway stations in Great Britain closed in 1966
Beeching closures in England
1862 establishments in England
Railway station